David Charles Napier Webb (November 20, 1928 - October 1, 2016) was a consultant to government agencies, corporations, universities and nonprofit organizations on various aspects of aerospace development, technology, and education. Webb created an interdisciplinary Space Studies program at the University of North Dakota, where he later established the Earth System Science Institute, now known as the Department of Earth System Science and Policy.

Career 
Webb was recruited by Apollo 11 astronaut Buzz Aldrin to serve as founding full professor and chairman of the Department of Space Studies, Center for Aerospace Sciences, University of North Dakota. There, Webb created and established the world's first interdisciplinary graduate degree program in Space Studies. He recruited the founding faculty which included Dick Parker (space medicine and biology), Joanne Gabrynowitcz  (space law and policy), Jim Vedda (space commercialization), and Grady Blount (planetary geology and Earth System Science). The broadly based curriculum combines scientific/technical, political/legal, social/psychological and other relevant fields of study into an integrated approach to our understanding of the issues and impacts associated with our entry into space and our attempts to live in and develop this new frontier. After Webb's departure from UND in 1990, the program was taken over by selenologist Chuck Wood, who expanded the program into the first Internet-based degree program in space studies (1993). Space Studies remains one of the largest graduate programs in North Dakota and more than 400 students have completed this program and received their M.Sc. degree.

At the University of North Dakota, Webb and Blount created one of the first fully interdisciplinary Earth System Science programs in the United States. This program incorporates into a single field of study the usually separate areas of atmospheric, earth and ocean sciences. This was in response to the then-speculative Earth Observing System of remote sensing satellites and integrated data systems. Blount went on to serve on the International Consultative Committee for Space Data Systems which defined many of the data formatting and calibration protocols for global environmental monitoring. The pair wrote an eight million dollar grant proposal to the United States Department of Agriculture which funded the construction and establishment of the Earth System Science Institute at UND (1988–1989), now known as the Department of Earth System Science and Policy. Webb, Blount and Vedda hosted the first (and only) International Conference on Hypersonic Flight in the 21st Century (1988). Gabrynowitcz went on to found the National Land Remote Sensing Data Archive Advisory Committee and served as a pioneer in the creation of space law and policy, particularly in the area of satellite remote sensing.

Webb was a consultant to government and corporate agencies, in national and international technological, economic and policy development issues, including space commercialization, space remote sensing, political and media issues. His clients included DOD, DARPA, USAF, NASA, Rockwell International, McDonnell Douglas, SAIC, Rocketdyne, Space Services, General Space Corporation, Eagle Engineering, International Space Corporation, Aerospace Industries Association. He also consulted for universities such as Harvard, Stanford, MIT, Caltech, California, Texas, Georgetown, George Washington University, George Mason University, William & Mary, North Carolina, North Dakota, Florida, Central Florida, Embry-Riddle on multidisciplinary space curricula development, information technology and 'virtual' program development and multi-university, cross-cultural program issues. His work with non-profit organizations includes The Webb Vocational Institute, Florida and California Space Grant Consortia, Florida Space Research Foundation, Astronauts Memorial Foundation, Space Studies Institute, National Space Society, U.S. Space Foundation, Mid-West Space Development Corporation, others.

Personal awards and recognition

Lifetime Achievement Recognition from the International Space University/International Singularity University, 2009.
NASA/DOD, National Aero-Space Plane Program: "For Outstanding Vision of the Impact of Hypersonic Technologies on the World Economy and Support of the National Aero-Space Plane Program." (1990).
International Space University: "For Outstanding Dedication and Leadership of the International Space University During its Critical Launch Phase 1987-88."  (1989).
First Frederick E. Osborn Award—International L5 Society: "For leadership in building an international pro-space movement."  (1985)
Students for the Exploration and Development of Space (SEDS): First Arthur C. Clarke Award, "In recognition of outstanding personal contributions in education towards the peaceful uses of outer space."  (1983). (Dr. David C. Webb was the recipient of the Award just before Carl Sagan)
Government of Canada, Queen Elizabeth II Silver Jubilee Medal: "In appreciation of worthy and devoted service." (1977).

References

2016 deaths
1928 births